João Elias Manamana (born 12 December 1973) is a Rwandan former professional footballer who played as a midfielder. He was capped for the Rwanda national football team and played at the 2004 African Cup of Nations.

References

1973 births
Living people
People from Cabinda (city)
Rwandan people of Angolan descent
Rwandan footballers
Association football midfielders
Rwanda international footballers
2004 African Cup of Nations players
Belgian Pro League players
K. Beerschot V.A.C. players
K.V. Mechelen players
K.V. Kortrijk players
APR F.C. players
R.A.A. Louviéroise players
Rwandan expatriate footballers
Expatriate footballers in Belgium
Rwandan expatriate sportspeople in Belgium
Expatriate footballers in Greece
Rwandan expatriate sportspeople in Greece
Sportspeople from Cabinda Province